Aleksandr Vasilievich Nikolayev (30 August 1897 – 27 June 1957), also known as Usto Mumin,  was a Soviet painter of Russian origin, who lived and worked in the Uzbek SSR.

Biography

Early years 
Alexander Nikolayev was born in Voronezh in 1897. His father was a military engineer, who traveled extensively around Russian Empire, taking the family with him, before settling permanently in Voronezh in 1914. Nikolayev studied in the Sumsk Military School from 1908 till 1916. There he met his first painting teacher Nikolay Evlampiev. After military school he served in Imperial Russian Army in 1916–1917. After army studied in Uhlan School in Tver till 1918, when he started to attend the art studio of Alexander Buchkuri in Voronezh. He began to study in the Second State Free Art Studio in Moscow in 1919 under Kazimir Malevich. Shortly after the beginning of his studies he was  drafted to Red Army and sent to the front.

Central Asia 
Nikolayev was sent to Tashkent after demobilization in 1920. His mission was to develop art and culture in new Soviet Central Asia and work closely with Turkestan Central Executive Committee. Nikolayev felt in love with Central Asia. The local culture and traditions started to influence and inspire his life and art. There is a legend that said Alexander Nikolayev converted to Islam, which cannot be supported by any official documents because of persecution of religion by Soviet authorities after revolution.
He received a new name from his pupils - Usto Mumin, which means "Faithful and Gentle Master".

Arrest and imprisonment 
He was working as a director of Uzbek Pavilion at Union Agricultural Exhibition in Moscow, when he was unexpectedly arrested and imprisoned. One of the reasons for his arrest was his homosexuality. Many of his works, painted in his early Uzbek period had homoerotic themes and used Bacha bazi as a subject. One of his most well-known paintings "Pomegranate Zeal", which is in the iconographic tradition, tells the story of two young boys from the moment they meet until their death. He spent four years in prison and was released in 1942. He wasn't allowed to paint while in prison.

Later years 
After release, Nikolaev returned to Uzbekistan and continued to work as illustrator and theatre designer. He received a Honorary Award from the Central Executive Committee of Uzbek Soviet Socialist Republic for his role in establishing the Uighur Theatre in Tashkent. Alexander Nikolayev died in Tashkent in 1957.

Exhibitions and collections 
Usto Mumin's works are in collections of museums in post USSR countries, including State Museum of Oriental Art in Moscow, Nukus Museum of Art and Museum of Arts of Uzbekistan. He exhibited throughout USSR during his lifetime, including exhibition "Old Samarkand" in Samarkand in 1924, Jubilee Exhibition of Soviet Art in Moscow in 1927 and several exhibitions in Tashkent. Tretyakov Gallery exhibited works of Usto Mumin in 2010 as part of Russian Orientalist paintings exhibition.

Notable exhibitions
2006. "Ecstasy of Usto Mumin". Ilkhom Theatre gallery. Tashkent
2013. "Echo of Vanguard". Ilkhom Theatre gallery. Tashkent
2017. "Retrospective of XX century Uzbek art". Uzbekistan Academy of Arts. Tashkent

In modern culture 
Tashkent theatre Ilkhom created a project "Pomegranate Zeal" after Usto Mumin. It is a play combined with an exhibition of Usto Mumin's paintings.

References 

1897 births
1957 deaths
Russian painters
Artists from Tashkent
Russian LGBT painters
People from Samarkand
20th-century Russian painters
20th-century Russian LGBT people